Ralph Horatio Greenhalgh (8 May 1899 – 24 December 1965) was an Australian rules footballer who played with Footscray in the Victorian Football League (VFL).

Notes

External links 

1899 births
1965 deaths
Australian rules footballers from Victoria (Australia)
Western Bulldogs players